Håvard Alstadheim (24 May 1936 – 7 September 1998) was a Norwegian economist and politician for the Liberal Party.

He was born in Stjørdal, and took the cand.oecon. degree. He was appointed as a docent in economics at the University of Trondheim in 1975, and was promoted to professor. He retired in 1993 to become director of agriculture in Sør-Trøndelag County Municipality.

He was a State Secretary in the Ministry of Finance from 1972 to 1973, during Korvald's Cabinet. He was the mayor of Stjørdal from 1980 to 1985, then deputy mayor from 1986 to 1987 before serving as deputy county mayor of Nord-Trøndelag from 1988 to 1991. He chaired his party from 1990 to 1992, after having been deputy leader from 1986 to 1990. He was a candidate for the Parliament of Norway numerous times without being elected; in 1965 (fifth candidate in Oslo), 1977 (seventh candidate, Nord-Trøndelag) and 1985 (third candidate, Nord-Trøndelag).

References

1936 births
1998 deaths
People from Stjørdal
Academic staff of the Norwegian University of Science and Technology
Liberal Party (Norway) politicians
Norwegian state secretaries
Mayors of places in Nord-Trøndelag
20th-century Norwegian economists